Amanda Lee (born March 13), also known as AmaLee, is an American singer, voice actress, YouTuber, and virtual YouTuber (VTuber) under the name Monarch. She is known for her English covers of anime and video game songs on YouTube, which have been viewed over 1 billion times and has acquired her over 2 million subscribers. As a voice actress, Lee has provided her voice in several titles such as Dragon Ball Xenoverse 2, Kaguya-sama: Love Is War, Rio: Rainbow Gate!, SSSS.Dynazenon, Kageki Shojo!!, Girls' Frontline, Otherside Picnic, Adachi and Shimamura, My Dress-Up Darling, Aokana: Four Rhythm Across the Blue, and One Piece Film: Red.

Lee has also provided vocals for many independent video game soundtracks and theme songs – including a collaboration with Porter Robinson on "Fellow Feeling". In early 2017, she released her debut album, Nostalgia, which brought together English-language versions of 12 songs beloved by gaming and anime fans. The album charted at No. 6 on Billboard Heatseekers Albums, No. 27 on Billboard Independent Albums, No. 43 on Billboard Top Rock Albums, and No. 12 on UK Independent Album Breakers.

Career
In 2006, AmaLee began posting homemade videos of her covers of tunes popular with anime followers and gamers. Later in 2010, she and her friend Annalie created YouTube channel called LeeandLie. According to AmaLee, their channel name is a combination of "Lee" from her name, and "Lie" from Annalie's name. On December 14, 2010, LeeandLie uploaded their first video, a cover of the song "Scarlet" from the anime Ayashi no Ceres, translated and performed by AmaLee.

In 2011, AmaLee joined AX Idol, a singing competition hosted by Bang Zoom! Entertainment and Viz Media, affiliated with Anime Expo, a convention for anime fans held annually in Los Angeles and won the grand prize. Since then, she has also had the occupation of providing her voice to shows and titles such as Dragon Ball Xenoverse 2, One Piece, Yandere Simulator, Gosick, Rio: Rainbow Gate!, K-On!!, and Show by Rock!!, among others. Amanda has also provided vocals for many independent video game soundtracks and theme songs – including a collaboration with Porter Robinson. She is also known for singing the English version of "Lagrima", the eleventh ending theme of Dragon Ball Super.

On September 2, 2012, they uploaded their most viewed video, a cover of the song "Crossing Field" from the anime Sword Art Online, with over 23 million views as of July 2022. In 2014, Annalie left the channel, leaving it the sole property of AmaLee, though the channel name remains "LeeandLie".

On January 7, 2017, she released her first album, Nostalgia, which brought together English-language versions of 12 songs beloved by gaming and anime fans. The album charted at No. 6 on Billboard Heatseekers Albums, No. 27 on Billboard Independent Albums, and No. 43 on Billboard Top Rock Albums. On September 22, 2017, she released an EP titled Hourglass which contains five original songs.

In July 2017, Lee performed in Los Angeles Convention Center as part of the 2017 Anime Expo. On August 22, 2017, it was announced that AmaLee would be joining YouTube stars NateWantsToBattle and MandoPony on "The Cool and Good Tour" across America. AmaLee provides vocals and lyrics on multiplayer online battle arena game League of Legends 2019 Ranked Season trailer.

On December 11, 2021, AmaLee became a VTuber under the name "Monarch". Because of her interest based on discovering VTubers, she decided to become one herself. AmaLee's VTuber debut as Monarch was set for December 11 (Saturday) at 5:00 PM PST / 8:00 PM EST on Twitch.

Discography

Studio albums

Cover albums

Original album

Extended plays

Original EP

Cover EP

Filmography

Anime

Films

Video games

Awards and nominations

References

External links
 
 
 
 AmaLee discography at Discogs
 AmaLee discography on Apple Music
 

Living people
American bloggers
American video game actresses
American voice actresses
American women bloggers
American YouTubers
Cover artists
Music YouTubers
YouTube channels launched in 2010
YouTube vloggers
21st-century American women singers
VTubers